Saturday Down South is an online publication that covers college football and other sports related to the schools in the Southeastern Conference. It is owned and operated by XLMedia.

Saturday Down South produces daily digital content covering the schools of the SEC. The website has a section for each of the 14 Southeastern Conference schools. Saturday Down South also produces regular content to its social media channels, podcast feeds and YouTube channel. In 2016, Saturday Down South was named one of the 50 must-follow college football Twitter accounts.

The website directly covers the following teams within the Southeastern Conference: The Alabama Crimson Tide, Arkansas Razorbacks, Auburn Tigers, Florida Gators, Georgia Bulldogs, Kentucky Wildcats, LSU Tigers, Mississippi Rebels, Mississippi State Bulldogs, Missouri Tigers, South Carolina Gamecocks, Tennessee Volunteers, Texas A&M Aggies, Vanderbilt Commodores. While the focus of the coverage mostly centers around the college football season, Saturday Down South also covers major college sporting events such as March Madness and the College World Series.

History 

The website was founded in 2010 and gained popularity among college football fans through its regular commentary and news on SEC football. An early example is when Saturday Down South broke the news of Will Muschamp being hired by the University of Florida.

In 2015, the Saturday Down South team launched another website named Saturday Tradition aimed at the coverage of sports teams within the Big Ten Conference.

In September 2016, Saturday Down South partnered with Texas Pete Hot Sauce and Bud Light on sponsorship campaigns targeting college football fans in the Southeast region of the United States.

In 2017, Saturday Down South launched the Saturday Down South Podcast which can feature notable college football guests such as Paul Finebaum.

In September 2021, Saturday Down South was acquired by XLMedia.

In November 2021, the Saturday Down South team launched another website named Saturday Road aimed at the coverage of the sports teams within the Atlantic Coast Conference.

In December 2021, the Saturday Down South team launched another website named Saturday Out West aimed at the coverage of the sports teams within the Pac-12 Conference.

Featured Stories 

In 2017, Saturday Down South spent time with former Ole Miss head coach Billy Brewer in which he reflected on his time since coaching major college football. Billy Brewer coached Ole Miss between the years of 1983 and 1993.

In April 2017, Saturday Down South published the reporting of the events and process on how the University of Alabama was able to hire Nick Saban away from the Miami Dolphins with insights from those around Coach Saban including his wife, Terry Saban.

In May 2017, Saturday Down South published a feature on LSU head coach Ed Orgeron and the small Louisiana community from which he was raised. Orgeron told Saturday Down South, "For my mother and my father, for me to be the head coach at LSU would have been utopia, more than they could ever dream about."

In October 2017, Saturday Down South published a feature on ESPN and SEC Network personality Paul Finebaum.

In 2018, Saturday Down South spent time with former Auburn and NFL running back Cadillac Williams and published a featured story about his career and new role as a high school football coach.

In January 2020 while the LSU Tigers were competing for a national championship, Saturday Down South spent time in quarterback Joe Burrow's hometown of Athens, Ohio.

In June 2022, the Saturday Down South launched an indepth, 4-part series on the evolution of the sport of college softball. Through research, the editorial team noticed the sport is undergoing a major shift where home run numbers are rising throughout the sport. The project involves original reporting and research to dig in and present what is causing this major transition in softball.

References

External links

Sport websites